The 2nd Albany County Militia Regiment was the local militia unit for Schenectady, New York, during the American Revolutionary War under the command of Colonel Abraham Wemple. The regiment saw action with the Continental Army in 1777 at the Battle of Saratoga in General John Glover's brigade. It was called out to fight against the loyalist and their Indian allies at the Battle of Klock's Field on October 19, 1780, and Battle of Johnstown on October 25, 1781. A member from the 2nd Albany may have been the person who killed the Loyalist officer Walter Butler of Butler's Rangers on October 30, 1781, during a skirmish.

See also
Albany County militia

External links
Reenactor website
Bibliography of the Continental Army in New York compiled by the United States Army Center of Military History

Schenectady, New York
Albany militia